Louis Philippe Mathieu Carle (born September 30, 1987) is a Canadian former professional ice hockey defenceman. He played in the National Hockey League (NHL) with the Montreal Canadiens. Carle was selected by the Canadiens in the second round, 53rd overall, of the 2006 NHL Entry Draft.

Prior to turning professional, Carle played in the Quebec Major Junior Hockey League (QMJHL) with the Acadie–Bathurst Titan and Rouyn-Noranda Huskies.

Playing career
As a youth, Carle played in the 2001 Quebec International Pee-Wee Hockey Tournament with a minor ice hockey team from Gatineau, Quebec.

QMJHL
Carle was drafted in the first round, 14th overall, by the Acadie–Bathurst Titan in the 2003 QMJHL Draft. After the 2003–04 season, Carle was named to the QMJHL Rookie All-Star Team.

He stayed with the Titans until 2007 when he was traded to the Rouyn-Noranda Huskies in exchange for Marc-Antoine Desnoyers and two draft picks. He signed a three-year entry level contract with the Montreal Canadiens on May 8, 2007. He participated in the Canadiens training and development camps but was assigned to their American Hockey League (AHL) affiliate, the Hamilton Bulldogs, for the 2007–08 season.

Professional
On September 24, 2008, Carle was knocked unconscious after being hit by Tomáš Kopecký of the Detroit Red Wings in a pre-season game. After the hit, he suffered a concussion and was out of the lineup for a month.

In the 2009–10 season on November 3, 2009, Carle was recalled from the Hamilton Bulldogs of the AHL by the Canadiens and made his NHL debut against the Atlanta Thrashers. Carle went scoreless in three games with the Canadiens before returning to the Bulldogs to score 15 points in 31 games before missing 44 games throughout the season to injury. Carle was then re-signed by Montreal to a one-year contract on July 13, 2010.

On July 15, 2011, he was traded from Montreal to Anaheim for defensemen Mark Mitera. After spending the duration of the 2011–12 season with the Ducks affiliate, the Syracuse Crunch of the AHL, Carle signed a one-year contract with Latvian club, Dinamo Riga, of the KHL on May 2, 2012. During the 2012-13 season, after 35 games with Riga, Carle was released and signed a contract for the remainder of season with Genève-Servette HC in the Swiss National League A on January 15, 2013.

On July 27, 2013 Carle returned to the KHL and signed one-year contract with newcomers, KHL Medveščak Zagreb of Croatia. After two seasons with Zagreb, Carle signed a two-year contract with German club, Adler Mannheim of the DEL on July 7, 2015.

Following the 2018–19 season, playing with EHC Black Wings Linz in the Austrian Hockey League (EBEL), Carle opted to end his 12 year professional career and return to North America.

Career statistics

Regular season and playoffs

International

References

External links

1987 births
Living people
Acadie–Bathurst Titan players
Adler Mannheim players
EHC Black Wings Linz players
Canadian ice hockey defencemen
Dinamo Riga players
Genève-Servette HC players
Hamilton Bulldogs (AHL) players
KHL Medveščak Zagreb players
Montreal Canadiens draft picks
Montreal Canadiens players
Rouyn-Noranda Huskies players
Syracuse Crunch players
Ice hockey people from Gatineau
Canadian expatriate ice hockey players in Croatia
Canadian expatriate ice hockey players in Latvia
Canadian expatriate ice hockey players in Germany
Canadian expatriate ice hockey players in Switzerland